Dr. Jean Pierre Soulier (14 September 1915 – 18 January 2003) was a French physician and haematologist. He was the General Director of Centre National de Transfusion Sanguine (CNTS) Paris and professor of haematology at the University of Paris, at the Necker Hospital for Sick Children.

References
 

French hematologists
1915 births
2003 deaths
Academic staff of the University of Paris